Visage is a compilation video by the British band Visage, released in August 1985.

Background
The compilation collects most of the music videos from the band's career between 1980–84, including songs from their first three studio albums. The first part of the video consists of music clips directed by Godley & Creme, Midge Ure, Tim Pope and Jean-Claude Luyat interspersed with interludes filmed by Luyat. The footage from "Can You Hear Me" onwards is film material shot by Luyat in Egypt, which includes tracks from The Anvil and Beat Boy. This includes footage shot for the song "Love Glove", though the original promo video for the song (directed by Nick Morris in a late night London Docklands setting) is not included.

Steve Strange announced the release of the video in 1985 in an interview for a German television show, saying that it was going to be "a documentary on the history of Visage".

The video was produced in 1985, according to end credits, and released in 1985 by Polygram's "Channel 5" brand, when Visage had already disbanded. In 2006, Universal Music released Visage on DVD with a different cover and liner notes by music journalist Paul Simper.

Track listing
The following is the VHS track listing. The DVD release does not list "The Steps", "The Dancer" and two parts of "Can You Hear Me" as separate titles (although it is identical to the VHS release), and adds jukebox and an audio-only option as extra features.

 "Visage"
 "The Steps" (interlude)
 "Fade to Grey"
 "The Dancer" (interlude)
 "Damned Don't Cry"
 "Pleasure Boys"
 "Mind of a Toy"
 "Night Train"
 "Can You Hear Me" (interlude)
 "Casualty" (interlude)
 "The Horseman"
 "Yesterday's Shadow"
 "Love Glove"
 "Wild Life"
 "Beat Boy"
 "Can You Hear Me" (Reprise) (end credits)

Personnel
 Starring Steve Strange and Rusty Egan
 Executive Producers: Franz Auffray and Jean-Baptiste Donzella
 Directed and Filmed by: Jean-Claude Luyat
 Compilation Video Editor: Simon Brewster
 Compilation Produced and Directed by: Peter Olliff

References

1986 video albums
Music video compilation albums
Pop video albums
Universal Music Group video albums
Video albums by British artists